66 Aquilae, abbreviated 66 Aql, is a fifth-magnitude star in the constellation of Aquila. 66 Aquilae is its Flamsteed designation. It is visible to the naked eye, having an apparent visual magnitude of 5.44. It is moving closer to the Earth with a heliocentric radial velocity of −30 km/s. The motion of the star over time suggests some displacement, which may indicate it is a close binary system.

This is an aging giant star with a stellar classification of K5 III, which indicates it has exhausted the supply of hydrogen at its core and expanded off the main sequence. At its estimated distance, this yields a physical size of roughly 59 times the radius of the Sun. It is radiating 635 times the Sun's luminosity from its enlarged photosphere at an effective temperature of 4,040 K, giving the star an orange hue.

References

K-type giants
Aquila (constellation)
Durchmusterung objects
Aquilae, 66
192107
099631
7720